Kagojer Bou is a Bengali social drama film directed by Bappaditya Bandopadhyay based on a same name novel of Shirshendu Mukhopadhyay. This film was released on 4 February 2011.

Plot
This is the story of love, lust, betrayal between relationships and analysis the characters of modern society. Highly ambitious Upal meets Subimal, a wealthy businessman. Upal manages to get a young lady, Preety close to Subimal. Preety goes to a resort in Mondarmoni with Subimal and find Upal there. She understands the whole plot.

Cast
 Rahul Banerjee as Upal
 Paoli Dam as Preety
 Bratya Basu as Manik Saha
 Rimjhim Gupta as Shreya
 Priyanka Sarkar as Ketaki
 Joy Sengupta as Subimal
 Dipak Mandal
 Nandini Ghosal
 Anindo Banerjee
 Nimai Ghosh

References

External links
 

2011 films
Indian drama films
Films based on Indian novels
Films based on works by Shirshendu Mukhopadhyay
Bengali-language Indian films
2010s Bengali-language films
Films directed by Bappaditya Bandopadhyay